is a 1950 black-and-white Japanese film musical comedy and drama directed by Torajiro Saito.

Cast 
 Hibari Misora as an orphan Mariko Tanimoto
 Haruhisa Kawata (川田晴久) as the street musician Sanpei
 Shunji Sakai (堺駿二) as Sanpei's pal Shin-chan
 Taeko Takasugi (高杉妙子)
 Ayuko Saijō (西條鮎子)
 Achako Hanabishi (花菱アチャコ) as Koichi Tanimoto, Mariko's father
 Kenichi Enomoto (榎本健一) as the fortune teller
 and others

See also
 List of films in the public domain in the United States

References

External links 
 screenshots from the film
 

1950s musical comedy-drama films
Japanese black-and-white films
1950 films
Films directed by Torajiro Saito
Japanese musical comedy-drama films
Shochiku films
1950s Japanese films